Furnished Souls for Rent is the second and final album released by Mourning Widows, a band led by former Extreme guitarist Nuno Bettencourt.

Track listing
All songs written by Nuno Bettencourt, except where noted.
 "All Automatic" - 4:51
 "No Regrets" - 4:43
 "UpsideDownside" - 4:42
 "667" - 4:35
 "The Air That You Breathe" - 4:49
 "Fuck You" - 4:53
 "Space" - 5:33
 "Angerexia" - 5:01
 "Monkey Paw" - 4:04
 "The Swing" - 4:01
 "War Paint" - 4:24
 "Furnished Souls For Rent" - 5:05

Other songs that were demos considered for the album were "N.O.Y.B.", "The Police", "Home Division", "SOS (Save Our Souls)" and "Unhappy Birthday", which ended up on the next album from Population 1.

Band members
 Nuno Bettencourt - guitar and lead vocals
 Donovan Bettencourt - bass and vocals
 Jeff Consi - drums and vocals

References

Nuno Bettencourt albums
2000 albums